A Deemster is a judge in the Isle of Man. The High Court of Justice of the Isle of Man is presided over by a deemster or, in the case of the appeal division of that court, a deemster and the Judge of Appeal. The deemsters also promulgate the Laws on Tynwald Day by reading out brief summaries of them in English and Manx.

In the past, the First and Second Deemsters had ex officio seats in the Legislative Council of the Isle of Man. The Second Deemster was removed from the council in 1965 and the First Deemster in 1975.

There are currently (2017) three full-time Deemsters. These are the First Deemster and Clerk of the Rolls (who is also the Deputy Governor), the Second Deemster, and an additional full-time Deemster. The offices of First Deemster, Second Deemster and Clerk of the Rolls are ancient offices. The offices of First Deemster and Clerk of the Rolls were combined in 1918, and a new office of Deputy Deemster was created in 2002 but abolished in 2009. Additional part-time Deemsters (previously called Acting Deemsters) are appointed from time to time to hear a particular case.

The First Deemster, Second Deemster and Judge of Appeal are appointed by, and hold office during the pleasure of, the Lord of Mann (acting on the advice of the UK's Secretary of State for Justice). Additional deemsters are appointed by the Lieutenant Governor on the recommendation of the First Deemster. As ex officio Deputy Governor, the First Deemster acts in place of the Lieutenant Governor in the latter's absence, or during a vacancy in that office.

Unlike judges in the United Kingdom, Deemsters have no security of tenure and thus have no legal protection against dismissal by the government. The appointment and removal of Manx judges on the formal advice of United Kingdom politicians is seen as an effective alternative.

Current Deemsters
The current Deemsters are:

First Deemster and Clerk of the Rolls, Andrew Corlett
Second Deemster (Y Nah Vriw), John Needham
 Deemster Graeme Cook and
Judge of Appeal, Jeremy Storey

List of Deemsters

Owing to a lack of early records, the list cannot record any deemsters before 1408, and is therefore not necessarily complete for the earlier years. The dates given are those for the first appearance of a name in the records, although the person may have been in office for some time previously.

The list has been compiled from the Liber Juramentorum (the book recording the oaths taken by officers on appointment), the Isle of Man Statutes with additional names from the archive of David Craine.

First Deemsters

First Deemsters and Clerks of the Rolls
Stewart Stevenson Moore, 1916–1921
Charles Cheslyn Callow, 1921–1934
Reginald Douglas Farrant, 1934–1947
William Percy Cowley, 1947–1958
Sydney James Kneale, 1958–1969
George Edgar Moore, 1969–1974
Robert Kinley Eason, 1974–1980
Arthur Christian Luft, 1980–1988
John William Corrin, 1988–1998
Thomas William Cain, 1998–2003
Michael Kerruish, 2003–2010
David Doyle  2010–2018
Andrew Corlett, 2018–present

Second Deemsters

Deemsters
Andrew Corlett, 2009-2011
Alastair Montgomerie, 2011–2019
Graeme Cook, 2020-present

Deputy Deemsters
 Andrew Williamson, 2002–2007
 Andrew Corlett, 2007–2009

In fiction

One of the main characters in Alfred Hitchcock 1929 drama film The Manxman is the deemster, and his holding this position is of central importance to the film's plot. The film is based on the 1894 novel of the same name  by the Manx writer Hall Caine, who published another novel with a similar theme with the title The Deemster (1887).

The 1953 George Bellairs crime novel "Half-Mast for the Deemster" features the murder of the Deemster.

See also
 Tynwald
 Clerk of the Rolls
 Manx Judiciary
 Moot hill: where there were deemsters (dempsters)

References

External links

Isle of Man Courts

Manx law
Judiciary of the Isle of Man